Julie Fedorchak is a member of the North Dakota Public Service Commission. She was appointed to the commission by Governor Jack Dalrymple in December 2012 and twice won reelection to that position: to a two-year term in 2014 and to a six-year term in 2016.

Electoral history

References
6. Personal Website

Living people
North Dakota Public Service Commissioners
North Dakota Republicans
People from Williston, North Dakota
University of North Dakota alumni
Women in North Dakota politics
Year of birth missing (living people)
21st-century American women